TAP Flight 425 was a regular flight from Brussels, Belgium, to Santa Catarina Airport (informally known as Funchal Airport or Madeira Airport;  now the Cristiano Ronaldo International Airport), Portugal, with an intermediate scheduled stop in Lisbon. On November 19, 1977, the Boeing 727 operating the service overran the airport's runway before crashing onto the nearby beach and exploding, killing 131 of the 164 people on board.

Aircraft and crew 
The aircraft operating flight TP-425 was a Boeing 727-282 Advanced registration CS-TBR named after the Portuguese aviation pioneer Sacadura Cabral. Its manufacturer serial number was 20972/1096 and it was delivered to TAP on 21 January 1975. It was powered by 3 Pratt & Whitney JT8D-17 turbofan engines which had a maximum thrust of 16,000 pounds each. The aircraft had completed a B check on 21 September 1977, and at the time of the accident had accumulated 6,154 flying hours in 5,204 cycles.

The crew consisted of Captain João Lontrão, First officer Miguel Guimarães Leal, and Flight engineer Gualdino Pinto, as well as five flight attendants. There were 156 passengers on board.

Accident 
On 19 November 1977, the aircraft operated flight TP-420 from Lisbon to Brussels, Belgium, and then TP-425 from Brussels to Funchal with a stopover in Lisbon. Flight 420 and the first leg of Flight 425 were completed without any issues reported. In Lisbon, the crew received a weather report of Funchal. According to the forecast, severe weather was expected on the route with a chance of thunderstorm cumulus and torrential rain, but was unlikely to affect the flight.

At 7:50 pm flight 425 left the gate, and took off from runway 03 of Lisbon airport at 7:55.

At 9:05 pm, on the approach to Madeira, the crew of flight 425 requested permission to descend. The controller gave permission to descend to flight level 50 (5 thousand feet or 1524 meters) at a pressure of 1013.2 mbar. At 9:05:50, the crew reported on the beginning of the descent to tier 50 towards Porto Santo, and received instructions to switch to 118.1 MHz to communicate with Funchal control. At 9:17 the crew contacted the air traffic control in Funchal and reported on the occupation of flight level 50 and the estimated achievement of the MAD radio beacon in 5 minutes. In response, the controller gave permission to descend to a height of 3,500 feet on QNH 1013 and reported that the landing would be on runway 06. The controller then transmitted the weather report: calm wind on runway 06, wind 14 knots direction 220 at nearby Rosário, temperature , visibility . The crew acknowledged the transmission. According to the actual weather forecast at 8:50, at the Funchal airport, near the tower, the wind was blowing at a speed of 06 knots (11 km/h) in the area of the runway - a heading of 200, visibility , cloudiness 7/8, rain showers, airfield pressure at runway 24: 1006 mbar, at runway 06: 1008 mbar, temperature .

At 9:23:13 the crew reported on the passage of the MAD beacon at a height of 1,700 feet and a heading of 215, while not having visual contact with the ground. Following the course of 200 and descending 980 feet, at 21:26:33 from flight TP-425 they reported that there was no visual observation of the runway and a missed approach.

After two unsuccessful attempts to land the aircraft, the crew decided to make one last try to land the plane, before they would have to make the decision to divert to the Gran Canaria Airport in the Canary Islands.

On the third landing attempt, captain Lontrão chose runway 24. The crew said that the landing lights were on. At 9:45:02 the crew reported on the passage of the airport's beacon and reported the runway in sight. At 9:46:48, when turning right on a 250° heading, captain Lontrão called for the landing checklist.

At 9:47:21 from the tower of the airport they reported the wind on runway 24 and asked if the crew would proceed with the landing. The crew said that they would continue. The controller subsequently cleared flight 425 to land. While on final approach to runway 24 in heavy rain, strong winds and poor visibility, the aircraft touched down  past the threshold, and started hydroplaning.

Of the 164 people aboard (156 passengers and eight crew), 131 were killed (125 passengers and 6 crew), making it the deadliest airplane accident in Portugal to that point. As of 2023, it is the second deadliest airplane accident in Portugal, after Independent Air Flight 1851. It remains TAP Portugal's only fatal accident since the beginning of its flight operations in 1946.

Investigation 
According to the findings of the investigation, the crew was qualified for the flight. The report stated that the aircraft was in good condition after leaving the runway up until it made impact with the bridge. It was also noted that there were an insufficient number of lights of the ILS, which made it difficult to perform an ILS approach. Difficult weather conditions were mentioned as the immediate causes of the accident, due to aquaplaning on the runway, as well as an overshoot landing speed of 19 knots. The investigation recommended Funchal Airport to increase the level of meteorological observations.

Aftermath 
After the accident occurred, TAP stopped flying the Boeing 727-200 to Madeira, and started flying only the 727-100, which was  shorter and took 60 fewer passengers.

The crash prompted officials to explore ways of extending the short runway. Because of the height of the runway relative to the beach below, an extension was very difficult and very expensive to perform. Between 1983 and 1986, a  extension was built; 14 years later, the runway was again extended.

See also
 List of accidents and incidents involving commercial aircraft

References

External links
Final accident report - DGAC 
Report document (Archive, Alternate, Archive) 
Pre-crash photos of CS-TBR

Airliner accidents and incidents involving runway overruns
Aviation accidents and incidents in 1977
Accidents and incidents involving the Boeing 727
Aviation accidents and incidents in Portugal
Airliner accidents and incidents caused by weather
425
1977 in Portugal
November 1977 events in Europe
Pages with unreviewed translations
1977 disasters in Portugal